Cho Jung-rae (born October 15, 1973) is a South Korean film director. Cho has made three feature films: Duresori: The Voice of the East (2012), the documentary Foulball (also known as Wonders, 2015), and the 2016 film Spirits' Homecoming. He has also directed about 200 commercials, television documentaries, music videos and short films. But the theatrical release had to be delayed because the film had trouble finding a distributor.

Filmography 
The Boil (short film, 2000) - director
Duresori: The Voice of the East (2012) - director, executive producer, script editor, actor
Where Are to Go? (2013) - actor
Foulball aka Wonders (documentary, 2015) - director
Spirits' Homecoming (2016) - director, screenwriter, producer
Spirits' Homecoming, Unfinished Story (2017) - director
A Long Way Around (2019) - producer
Sorikkun (2020) - director

Awards 
2016 53rd Grand Bell Awards: Best New Director (Spirits' Homecoming)

References

External links
 
 
 

1973 births
Living people
South Korean film directors
South Korean screenwriters
South Korean film producers
South Korean male film actors
Chung-Ang University alumni